Wilfred Leslie "Wilf" Lewis (1 July 1903 – 1976) was a former footballer, who played for Swansea Town, Huddersfield Town, Derby County and Yeovil and Petters United. He also played international football for Wales on six occasions.

References

1903 births
1976 deaths
Welsh footballers
Wales international footballers
Footballers from Swansea
Association football forwards
English Football League players
Swansea City A.F.C. players
Huddersfield Town A.F.C. players
Derby County F.C. players
Yeovil Town F.C. players